Kushuru Hirka (Ancash Quechua kushuru an edible kind of seaweed, hirka mountain, "kushuru mountain", also spelled Cushuroirca) is a mountain in the Cordillera Negra in the Andes of Peru which reaches a height of approximately . It lies in the Ancash Region, Recuay Province, on the border of the districts of Cotaparaco and Tapacocha.

References

Mountains of Peru
Mountains of Ancash Region